Cleves, Iowa, is a small town in north central Iowa with a bank, a repair shop, and a grain elevator. Cleves is in Hardin County, Iowa.

Geography

History

Cleves was platted in Section 36 about a mile southeast of Abbott, Iowa, in 1880 by the Rock Island Railroad, which was building a track though this part of Hardin County. N. Bonjer made an addition to the community in 1881. The Cleves town plat ran diagonally due to the rail line running diagonally through the community. 

The Cleves post office was established in 1881. A grain dealer, lumber and stockyard, and general store were also established during this era.

Cleves' population was 25 in 1900, and 75 in 1925.

In 1940, the population of Cleves was 50.

See also
Lawn Hill, Iowa

References

Populated places in Iowa